Power Duke was an Australian Thoroughbred racehorse that won the 1960 Group 1 Oakleigh Plate.

He was owned by a group of people, including the late  Alf Cane. Power Duke was put down only a matter of weeks after winning the Oakleigh Plate when his uncontrollable behaviour became too much for the trainer and owners.

References
 Power Duke's pedigree and racing stats

Racehorses bred in Australia